Barela is a town and nagar panchayat in Jabalpur district in the state of Madhya Pradesh, India. Its other name is Dharmnagri.

Geography

Demographics
 India census, Barela had a population of 10,874. Males constitute 53% of the population and females 47%. Barela has an average literacy rate of 70%, higher than the national average of 59.5%; with 59% of the males and 41% of females literate. 14% of the population is under 6 years of age.

References

Cities and towns in Jabalpur district